Yumiko Suzuki may refer to:

, Japanese sprint canoeist
, Japanese cyclist
Yumiko Suzuki (manga artist) (鈴木由美子, born 1960), Japanese manga artist